"In the Name of Love" is a song by Polish singer Monika Kuszyńska. It was released as the first single from her second solo studio album on 9 March 2015. The track was written by Monika Kuszyńska and Jakub Raczyński and was produced by Rafał Stępień. The song represented Poland in the Eurovision Song Contest 2015, where it reached 23rd place in general and 15th in televoting (with two jury votes).

The single was also recorded in Polish with the title "Obudź się i żyj" (Wake up and live) .

Background 
In the talk show Świat się kręci on 9 March 2015, it was announced that the Polish public broadcaster, TVP, had internally selected Monika Kuszyńska to represent Poland at the 2015 Eurovision Song Contest. During the program, Kuszyńska's song for the Eurovision Song Contest was officially revealed by TVP through the show of a music video for "In the Name of Love". The song was written by Monika Kuszyńska and Jakub Raczyński specifically for the Eurovision Song Contest.

Music video 
The music video premiered on YouTube on 9 March 2015. The video was directed by Roman Przylipiak. It was viewed more than 600,000 times in 24 hours. In the video, films and photos of the singer from times before her accident, which happened in 2006, were used.

Track listing

Credits and personnel 
Monika Kuszyńska – vocals, lyrics
Jakub Raczyński – music
Rafał Stępień – producer, piano
Marcin Gajko – mixing
Karol Mańkowski – audio generator
Michał Dąbrówka – drums
Bartosz Wojciechowski – bass guitar
Maciej Mąka – guitar
Marta Kalińska – violin
Paulina Wielgosińska – violin
Małgorzata Sowierka Chmiel – viola
Maria Katarzyna Filipiak – cello
Aleksandra Tabiszewska, Jan Radwan, Natalia Bajak – backing vocals

Credits adapted from Discogs.

Singer about her participation in ESC 
Monika Kuszyńska about her participation in the Eurovision Song Contest said:

References

2015 singles
2015 songs
Eurovision songs of 2015
Eurovision songs of Poland
Warner Music Group singles